The Basic Latin or C0 Controls and Basic Latin Unicode block is the first block of the Unicode standard, and the only block which is encoded in one byte in UTF-8. The block contains all the letters and control codes of the ASCII encoding. It ranges from U+0000 to U+007F, contains 128 characters and includes the C0 controls, ASCII punctuation and symbols, ASCII digits, both the uppercase and lowercase of the English alphabet and a control character.

The Basic Latin block was included in its present form from version 1.0.0 of the Unicode Standard, without addition or alteration of the character repertoire. Its block name in Unicode 1.0 was ASCII.

Table of characters

 The letter U+005C (\) may show up as a Yen(¥) or Won(₩) sign in Japanese/Korean fonts mistaking Unicode (especially UTF-8) as a legacy character set which replaced the backslash with these signs.

Subheadings
The C0 Controls and Basic Latin block contains six subheadings.

C0 controls
The C0 Controls, referred to as C0 ASCII control codes in version 1.0, are inherited from ASCII and other 7-bit and 8-bit encoding schemes. The Alias names for C0 controls are taken from the ISO/IEC 6429:1992 standard.

ASCII punctuation and symbols
This subheading refers to standard punctuation characters, simple mathematical operators, and symbols like the dollar sign, percent, ampersand, underscore, and pipe.

ASCII digits
The ASCII Digits subheading contains the standard European number characters 1–9 and 0.

Uppercase Latin alphabet
The Uppercase Latin alphabet subheading contains the standard 26-letter unaccented Latin alphabet in the majuscule.

Lowercase Latin alphabet
The Lowercase Latin Alphabet subheading contains the standard 26-letter unaccented Latin alphabet in the minuscule.

Control character
The Control Character subheading contains the "Delete" character.

Number of symbols, letters and control codes
The table below shows the number of letters, symbols and control codes in each of the subheadings in the C0 Controls and Basic Latin block.

Chart

Variants
Several of the  characters are defined to render as a standardized variant if followed by variant indicators.

A variant is defined for a zero with a short diagonal stroke: U+0030 DIGIT ZERO, U+FE00 VS1 (0︀).

Twelve characters (#, *, and the digits) can be followed by U+FE0E VS15 or U+FE0F VS16 to create emoji variants.
They are keycap base characters, for example #️⃣ (U+0023 NUMBER SIGN U+FE0F VS16 U+20E3 COMBINING ENCLOSING KEYCAP). The VS15 version is "text presentation" while the VS16 version is "emoji-style".

History
The following Unicode-related documents record the purpose and process of defining specific characters in the Basic Latin block:

See also
 Character set
 ISO 8859-1

References

Latin-script Unicode blocks
Unicode blocks